Luis Carlos Campos Villegas (born 29 October 1959) is a Mexican politician from the Institutional Revolutionary Party. From 2009 to 2012 he served as Deputy of the LXI Legislature of the Mexican Congress, representing the ninth district of Chihuahua.

References

1959 births
Living people
Chihuahua
Members of the Chamber of Deputies (Mexico)
Institutional Revolutionary Party politicians
21st-century Mexican politicians
Deputies of the LXI Legislature of Mexico